Little Charmers is a Canadian CGI interactive children's television series produced by Nelvana Enterprises and Spin Master Entertainment for Treehouse TV. The series premiered on Nickelodeon in the United States on January 12, 2015, and ended on April 15, 2017. Treehouse TV announced a week later that it was scheduled in Canada on the last day of January; however, episode 2 debuted six days after this announcement, and six days prior to the scheduled debut.

Series overview

Episodes

Season 1 (2015–16)

Season 2 (2017)

References

Lists of Canadian children's animated television series episodes